David Chisum (born February 5, 1970) is an American actor. He portrayed Miles Laurence on the ABC Daytime soap opera One Life to Live from February 9, 2007, to April 22, 2008. Chisum and Rebecca Staab starred in eight 35-second webisodes airing each week during the sixth season of the ABC television series Desperate Housewives. He also guest starred in the final iCarly episode "iGoodbye" portraying Steven Shay, the father of Carly and Spencer.

Chisum was a star quarterback in high school, in addition to performing in various school productions.

Chisum was born in Livonia, Michigan and raised in Fullerton, California. He and his wife Aishah are parents of a son, Aiden, and a daughter, Zoie.

Filmography

References

External links
David Chisum biography - SoapOperaDigest.com
 

1970 births
Male actors from Michigan
American male soap opera actors
American male television actors
21st-century American male actors
Living people
People from Livonia, Michigan
Male actors from Fullerton, California
New Mexico State Aggies football players